Mark Engel (born October 1, 1991) is an American alpine ski racer.

He competed at the 2017 World Championships and the 2018 Winter Olympics. Engel re-qualified for the 2014-2015 "C" team after winning the NCAA title in giant slalom with the University of Utah in 2014. In 2019, he won the NCAA national championship with the University of Utah.  He finished 12th in the giant slalom and won All American honors with a 9th-place finish in slalom.

References

External links
 
 
 
 Mark Engel at U.S. Ski & Snowboard
 

1991 births
Living people
American male alpine skiers
Olympic alpine skiers of the United States
Alpine skiers at the 2018 Winter Olympics